Lishan i Sipërm is a village in the former municipality of Luzni,  away from Peshkopi in northeastern Albania. At the 2015 local government reform it became part of the municipality Dibër. There are approximately 150 residents.

References

Populated places in Dibër (municipality)
Villages in Dibër County